The 2019 FIBA U16 Women's European Championship Division B was the 16th edition of the Division B of the European basketball championship for women's national under-16 teams. It was played in Sofia, Bulgaria, from 15 to 24 August 2019. Slovenia women's national under-16 basketball team won the tournament.

Participating teams

  (1st place, 2018 FIBA U16 Women's European Championship Division C)

  (14th place, 2018 FIBA U16 Women's European Championship Division A)

  (16th place, 2018 FIBA U16 Women's European Championship Division A)

  (15th place, 2018 FIBA U16 Women's European Championship Division A)

First round
In the first round, the teams were drawn into four groups. The first two teams from each group will advance to the quarterfinals, the third and fourth teams will advance to the 9th–16th place playoffs, the other teams will play in the 17th–23rd place classification.

Group A

Group B

Group C

Group D

17th–23rd place classification

Group E

Playoffs

9th–16th place playoffs

Championship playoffs

Final standings

References

External links
FIBA official website

2019
2019–20 in European women's basketball
International youth basketball competitions hosted by Bulgaria
Sports competitions in Sofia
FIBA U16
August 2019 sports events in Europe